Rochelle Aytes is an American actress and model. She is best known for her role as April Malloy on ABC drama series Mistresses (2013–16) and as the voice of Rochelle in the critically acclaimed video game Left 4 Dead 2 (2009). Aytes also starred in the auto-biography story film of TLC titled CrazySexyCool: The TLC Story as Perri "Pebbles" Reid, short-lived series Drive and The Forgotten (2009–10), as well as Criminal Minds and Work It. In film, Aytes has appeared in White Chicks, Madea's Family Reunion and Trick 'r Treat. Aytes also had a recurring role as Agent Greer, an ex-CIA officer, on the CBS television series Hawaii Five-0.

Early life and education
Aytes was born in Harlem, New York City, and attended Fiorello H. LaGuardia High School. She graduated with a Bachelor of Arts in Fine Arts from State University of New York at Purchase college. She began her career as model and has appeared in commercials for McDonald's, L'Oreal, Coca-Cola and Mercedes-Benz.

Career
Aytes made her film debut in the 2004 comedy White Chicks, as Denise Porter. She is also known for playing Lisa Breaux in Tyler Perry's Madea's Family Reunion, where Aytes plays a woman who is caught in a relationship in which her fiancé (Blair Underwood) beats and threatens her. In 2006, she played Nicole Jamieson in the test pilot episodes of Tyler Perry's House of Payne. She also provides the voice for Rochelle in Left 4 Dead 2. In 2007, Aytes guest starred in the Fox series Bones as Felicia Saroyan, the sister of Lab Supervisor, Cam. She starred in the independent film Trick 'r Treat She played role Leigh Barnthouse in the 2007 Fox series Drive. She also played Tara Kole in the TV show NCIS from CBS. Aytes also appeared in the TNT drama series Dark Blue in 2010.

Aytes was  a regular cast member in the ABC drama series The Forgotten from 2009 to 2010, playing Detective Grace Russell who teams up with a volunteer group, including former Chicago police detective, Christian Slater, to solve cases of missing or unidentified homicide victims. From 2010 to 2011, she had a recurring role in the ABC series Detroit 1-8-7 as prosecutor Alice Williams, until her character was murdered in the episode "Key to the City", which aired on January 11, 2011. In 2011, Aytes guest starred in three episodes as Amber James, the former girlfriend of Keith Watson, in the seventh season of ABC comedy-drama Desperate Housewives. She is represented by Ryan Daly of Zero Gravity Management. She also starred in the short-lived ABC sitcom Work It in 2012.

In 2012, Aytes was cast as one of the  four leads,   along with  Alyssa Milano, Yunjin Kim and Jes Macallan, in the ABC drama series Mistresses about the lives of four female friends and their involvement in an array of illicit and complex relationships. The series premiered on June 3, 2013. Aytes played the role of Perri "Pebbles" Reid in the 2013 biographical film CrazySexyCool: The TLC Story about the R&B and hip hop musical trio TLC. In 2013, she also began appearing as Savannah Hayes, Derek Morgan's (played by Shemar Moore) girlfriend on the CBS series, Criminal Minds. When Moore moved to S.W.A.T., her character was written out. However, Aytes was then cast as his character Hondo's girlfriend Nichelle on S.W.A.T. as well, starting in Season 3.

Filmography

Film and TV movies

Television

Video games

References

External links

Living people
21st-century American actresses
Actresses from New York City
People from Harlem
State University of New York at Purchase alumni
African-American actresses
American film actresses
American television actresses
American video game actresses
American voice actresses
21st-century African-American women
21st-century African-American people
20th-century African-American people
20th-century African-American women
Year of birth missing (living people)